At 89 is a studio album by Pete Seeger, released on September 30, 2008, via Appleseed Records. In 2008, the album earned Seeger the Grammy Award for Best Traditional Folk Album.

Composition
The album features a blend of instrumental and vocal songs, interspersed with spoken word segments. Several tracks were recorded at the Howland Center in Beacon, NY with a large group of people working in community.

"Song of the World's Last Whale" is an anti-whaling song composed by Seeger in 1970 after he listened to the "whale song" discovered by Roger Payne. He gave its rights to the Whale Fund, an auxiliary of the New York Zoological Society which is concerned with whale conservation. Despite playing the song live, he did not record it officially until At 89.

Track listing

Credits and personnel

Performers

 Sue Altkin – choir, chorus, vocals
 David Bernz – banjo, choir, chorus, guitar, guitar (12-string), vocals
 Robert Cagianese – additional violin ("Alleluya")
 Karen Cashin - chorus
 Sonya Cohen – vocals ("When I was most Beautiful")
 Jonathan Dickau – choir, chorus, engineer, mixing, vocals
 Angela Dourdis - chorus
 James Durst – choir, chorus, guitar ("Little Fat Baby"), vocals, ("Little Fat Baby, and "We Will Love or We Will Perish")
 Alison Hartwell - chorus
 Travis Jeffrey – vocals ("It's a long haul")
 Caroline Kruzansky - chorus, vocals ("Or Else!")
 Lisa McVey - chorus
 Sara Milonovich – violin
 Jenny Murphy - chorus
 Mark Murphy – bass, choir, chorus, vocals
 Melissa Ohrquist - chorus
 Perry Robinson – clarinet
 Martha Sandefer – choir, chorus, vocals ("Bach at Treblinka," "Little Fat Baby," and "We Will Love or We Will Perish")
 Pete Seeger – banjo, choir, chorus, guitar (12-string), guitar (nylon string), Native American flute, spoken word, vocals
 Laurie Siegel – choir, chorus, vocals
 Dave Tarlo - chorus, vocals ("Now We Sit us Down," and "We Will Love or We Will Perish")
 Bruce K. Taylor – choir, chorus, vocals
 Connie Taylor – choir, chorus, vocals
 Sarah Underhill - chorus
 The Walkabout Chorus - vocals ("Tzena, Tzena, Tzena," "If this World Survives")

Songwriting/Arranging

 Johann Sebastian Bach – composer
 David Bernz – arranger, composer, lyricist
 Travis Jeffrey – composer, lyricist
 Gordon Jenkins – composer, lyricist
 Alan Lomax – arranger, collection
 John A. Lomax – arranger, collection
 Pete Seeger - arranger, composer, lyricist
 Malvina Reynolds – composer, lyricist
 Lorre Wyatt – composer, lyricist

Production

 David Bernz – engineer, photography, producer
 Jonathan Dickau – engineer, mixing
 Christina Galbiati – graphic design
 David Glasser – mastering
 Judy Jacobs – photography
 Jim Musselman – executive producer, liner notes
 Pete Seeger – producer

References

External links
 At 89 at Appleseed Recordings

2008 albums
Pete Seeger albums